DDI may stand for:

Companies and organizations
 DD International, international TV channel in India
 Development Dimensions International, a talent management company
 Direct Democracy Ireland, a political party in Ireland
 KDDI, formerly DDI, a Japanese telecommunications company

Science
 Drug–drug interaction
 Didanosine, an antiretroviral drug

Technology
 Acronym for DNS/DHCP/IPAM; see IP Address Management
 Direct dial-in, or direct inward dialing, a telecommunications service
 D&D Insider, an online method used to deliver Dungeons & Dragons content
 Diverging diamond interchange, a road structure that guides traffic

Other uses
 Dance Dance Immolation, interactive performance piece
 Data Documentation Initiative, a standard for describing surveys, questionnaires, and statistical data files
 Democracy-Dictatorship Index, a binary measure of democracy and dictatorship
 Divisional detective inspector, a rank in the Criminal Investigation Department of London's police